The mathematician Irving Kaplansky is notable for proposing numerous conjectures in several branches of mathematics, including a list of ten conjectures on Hopf algebras. They are usually known as Kaplansky's conjectures.

Group rings
Let  be a field, and  a torsion-free group. Kaplansky's zero divisor conjecture states:

 The group ring  does not contain nontrivial zero divisors, that is, it is a domain.

Two related conjectures are known as, respectively, Kaplansky's idempotent conjecture:

and Kaplansky's unit conjecture (which was originally made by Graham Higman and popularized by Kaplansky):

The zero-divisor conjecture implies the idempotent conjecture and is implied by the unit conjecture. As of 2021, the zero divisor and idempotent conjectures are open. The unit conjecture, however, was disproved for fields of positive characteristic by Giles Gardam in February 2021: he published a preprint on the arXiv that constructs a counterexample. The field is of characteristic 2. (see also: Fibonacci group)

There are proofs of both the idempotent and zero-divisor conjectures for large classes of groups. For example, the zero-divisor conjecture is known to hold for all virtually solvable groups and more generally also for all residually torsion-free solvable groups. These solutions go through establishing first the conclusion to the Atiyah conjecture on -Betti numbers, from which the zero-divisor conjecture easily follows.

The idempotent conjecture has a generalisation, the Kadison idempotent conjecture, also known as the Kadison–Kaplansky conjecture, for elements in the reduced group C*-algebra. The latter has been positively solved for an extremely large class of groups, including for example all hyperbolic groups.

The unit conjecture is also known to hold in many groups, but its partial solutions are much less robust than the other two.  For example, there is a torsion-free 3-dimensional crystallographic group for which it is not known whether all units are trivial. This conjecture is not known to follow from any analytic statement like the other two, and so the cases where it is known to hold have all been established via a direct combinatorial approach involving the so-called unique products property. By Gardam's work mentioned above, it is now known to not be true in general.

Banach algebras
This conjecture states that every algebra homomorphism from the Banach algebra C(X) (continuous complex-valued functions on X, where X is a compact Hausdorff space) into any other Banach algebra, is necessarily continuous. The conjecture is equivalent to the statement that every algebra norm on C(X) is equivalent to the usual uniform norm. (Kaplansky himself had earlier shown that every complete algebra norm on C(X) is equivalent to the uniform norm.)

In the mid-1970s, H. Garth Dales and J. Esterle independently proved that, if one furthermore assumes the validity of the continuum hypothesis, there exist compact Hausdorff spaces X and discontinuous homomorphisms from C(X) to some Banach algebra, giving counterexamples to the conjecture.

In 1976, R. M. Solovay (building on work of H. Woodin) exhibited a model of ZFC (Zermelo–Fraenkel set theory + axiom of choice) in which Kaplansky's conjecture is true. Kaplansky's conjecture is thus an example of a statement undecidable in ZFC.

Quadratic forms

In 1953, Kaplansky proposed the conjecture that finite values of u-invariants can only be powers of 2.

In 1989, the conjecture was refuted by Alexander Merkurjev who demonstrated fields with u-invariants of any even m. In 1999, Oleg Izhboldin built a field with u-invariant m = 9 that was the first example of an odd u-invariant. In 2006, Alexander Vishik demonstrated fields with u-invariant  for any integer k starting from 3.

References

 H. G. Dales, Automatic continuity: a survey. Bull. London Math. Soc. 10 (1978), no. 2, 129–183.
 W. Lück, L2-Invariants:  Theory and Applications to Geometry and K-Theory.  Berlin:Springer 2002 
 D.S. Passman, The Algebraic Structure of Group Rings, Pure and Applied Mathematics, Wiley-Interscience, New York, 1977. 
 M. Puschnigg, The Kadison–Kaplansky conjecture for word-hyperbolic groups.  Invent. Math.  149  (2002),  no. 1, 153–194.
 H. G. Dales and W. H. Woodin, An introduction to independence for analysts, Cambridge 1987

Ring theory
Conjectures
Unsolved problems in mathematics